Oscar Clute (1837–1902) was president of the U.S. state of Michigan's State Agricultural College (now Michigan State University) from 1889 to 1893.

Early years
Oscar Clute was born in Albany, New York.

Career

1855–1859
From 1855 to 1859 Clute taught high school.

1862
In 1862, Clute graduated from the State Agricultural College where he eventually taught math for four years.

1864
Clute received his M.S. degree.

1889
Clute was selected to be the president of the State Agricultural College and remained so for four years.

1893
Became president of Florida Agricultural College, which is now the University of Florida.

1897
Clute and his family moved to Pomona, California, where he went back to ministry.

Family 
In 1864 Oscar married Mary Merrylees, who was the sister of Mrs. T.C. Abbot. Together the two had six children: William Merrylees, Oscar Clark, Lucy Merrylees, Katherine Spencer, Edward Hale and Marie Morrill.

Death
He died near Los Angeles, California, on January 27, 1902.

External links
Biographical Information (Michigan State University Archives & Historical Collections)

References

1857 births
1935 deaths
Presidents of Michigan State University